Op stap door Amsterdam is a 1919 Dutch silent film directed by Theo Frenkel.

Cast
 Piet Köhler - Plattelandsman
 Daan Nieuwenhuizen
 Johan Buziau
 Anton Roemer
 Piet Fuchs
 Kees Lageman
 Vera van Haeften
 Bob van Iersel
 Siem Nieuwenhuizen

External links 
 

1919 films
Dutch silent short films
Dutch black-and-white films
Films directed by Theo Frenkel